The Apostolic Prefecture of French Colonies in India  (sometimes confusingly called 'of Pondicherry') was an exempt pre-diocesan jurisdiction for Latin Catholic missions in the colonial enclaves constituting French India.

History 
In 1777 it was established as Apostolic Prefecture of the French Colonies in India, not entitled to a titular bishop, without a direct predecessor.

On 1886.09.01 it was suppressed, its territory being reassigned to the previously co-existent Metropolitan Archdiocese of Pondicherry (now Metropolitan Archdiocese of Pondicherry and Cuddalore).

Ordinaries 
(all Roman Rite and missionary priests from Europe, notably from Latin congregations)

Apostolic Prefects of the French Colonies in India 
 Sebastien de Nevers, Capuchin Franciscans (O.F.M. Cap.) (born France, as probably most of his successors) (1776.09.28 – 1980.11.27)
 Donatus Aurelinensis, O.F.M. Cap. (1780.11.27 – 1786.09.11)
 Hilarius Pictaviensis, O.F.M. Cap. (1786.09.11 – 1788.11.24)
 Damasus d’Oleron, O.F.M. Cap. (1788.11.24 – ?)
 Benedictus di Monterotundo, O.F.M. Cap. (1792.02.21 – ?)
 Pierre-Jean-Norbert Calmels, (1828.06.14 – 1859)
 Pierre Brunie (1859 – ?)

See also

 Goa Inquisition
 List of Catholic dioceses in India
 Persecution of Hindus
 Roman Catholicism in India

Source and external links 
 Adrien Launay, Histoire des Missions de l'Inde. Pondicherry, Maissour, Coimbatour, 5 volumes, Paris 1898
 GCatholic.org

Former Roman Catholic dioceses in India
Apostolic prefectures
French India
Religious organizations established in 1777
Religious organizations disestablished in 1886